CD109 (Cluster of Differentiation 109) is a human gene.

CD109 is a GPI-linked cell surface antigen expressed by CD34+ acute myeloid leukemia cell lines, T-cell lines, activated T lymphoblasts, endothelial cells, and activated platelets (Lin et al., 2002). In addition, the platelet-specific Gov antigen system (HPA15), implicated in refractoriness to platelet transfusion, neonatal alloimmune thrombocytopenia, and posttransfusion purpura, is carried by CD109 (Kelton et al., 1990; Lin et al., 2002).[supplied by OMIM]

See also
 Cluster of differentiation

References

Further reading

External links
 
 

Clusters of differentiation